Leninskaya Line, is a line of the Novosibirsk Metro. It bisects the city on a northwest–southeast axis before making a 90 degree turn and crossing the river Ob river on a closed bridge.

Leninskaya was the first line of the Metro and opened in 1986 with five stations. It expanded twice, in 1991 and 1992, adding three stations before financial difficulties slowed the development of new stations.

Timeline

Transfers

Rolling stock
The line is served by the city's single depot Eltsovskoe, and currently 18 four carriage 81-717/714 trains are assigned to it.

Recent developments and future plans
Since the 1990s, there have been several moves to expand the line to Ploshchad Stanislavskogo. Initially, the city planned to start construction in 2010; however there has been no construction. In 2014, the city indicated that it would move forward on planning for two new stations on the Dzerzhinskaya Line instead. In 2018, the mayor of Novosibirsk stated that it was necessary to build Ploshchad Stanislavskogo to relieve automobile traffic. The mayor estimated the cost to complete three new stations would be about 20 billion rubles.

References

Novosibirsk Metro
Railway lines opened in 1986